Kamil Wiktor Rzetelski (born 12 September 1996) is a Polish visually impaired Paralympic swimmer who competes in international level events. He is a double World medalist and a double European bronze medalist, he has competed for Poland at the 2016 Summer Paralympics where he did not medal in any of his events.

References

1996 births
Living people
Sportspeople from Gdańsk
Paralympic swimmers of Poland
Swimmers at the 2016 Summer Paralympics
Medalists at the World Para Swimming Championships
Medalists at the World Para Swimming European Championships
Polish male freestyle swimmers
Polish male butterfly swimmers
S13-classified Paralympic swimmers
21st-century Polish people